Baleqlu may refer to:
 Baleqlu, Fars
 Baleqlu, Markazi